The Goderich Pirates are a senior hockey team based out of Goderich, Ontario, Canada.  They play in the Western Ontario Athletic Association Senior Hockey League.

Championships
Goderich has won two WOAA Championship, back in the 1953-54 season and the 1997-98 season.

2006-07 Pirates Season
Goderich, coming off an 8-17-0 season in 2005-06, improved a little bit, going 9-13-2, good for seventh in the WOAA South Division.

The Pirates were swept by the Ripley Wolves in the Sr. "A" quarter-finals, although the scores of the game were close, including a controversial goal scored by Ripley in overtime in the 3rd game of the series.  After the goal, Pirates general manager Trevor Bazinet stormed onto the ice, had an argument with the referee, and ended up hitting him. South Bruce OPP were called to the game but the hockey official declined to press charges.

2007-08 Pirates Season
Goderich would once again improve from their previous season, as they finished the year with a record of 11-15-0, earning 22 points.  It was the Pirates highest win total and point total since the 1998-99 season.

The team would face the Thedford Dirty Dogs, in a best of three qualifying round, with the winner advancing to the WOAA "A" playoffs.  The Dirty Dogs, who went pointless during the season, stunned the Pirates in the series opener in Goderich with a 4-2 win.  The Pirates fought back in the second game in Thedford with a 4-1 victory, setting up a third and deciding game back in Goderich.  The Pirates would close out the series with a 7-1 rout, advancing to the "A" playoffs.

Goderich would face the defending "A" champions, the Durham Thundercats, in the "A" quarter-finals, and the Pirates lost the series opener 7-4, but followed it up with a solid 6-3 win in the second game to even the series up.  Durham took control of the series, holding off the Pirates 6-5 in the third game, followed by a 6-4 victory in the fourth game, as they took a 3-1 series lead.  Goderich played a very solid fifth game, winning 5-3 to cut the Thundercats series lead to 3-2, but Durham would close it out with 6-4 win in the sixth game, eliminating the Pirates from the post-season.

2008-09 Pirates Season
Goderich would continue to improve in the 2008-09 season, as they finished with a record of 9-10-1, earning 19 points, and eighth place in the WOAA South Division standings.

The Pirates opened the playoffs against the Petrolia Squires in a best of seven series, with the winner moving on to the "AA" quarter-finals.  The Squires opened the series with a win, holding off Goderich 4-3.  The Pirates were able to send the second game in overtime, however, Petrolia once again came out on top, winning 4-3 to take a 2-0 series lead.  In the third game, the Squires once again took the victory, winning 7-5, and poised to sweep the series.  In the fourth game, Goderich kept the game close once again, however, found themselves on the wrong side of a 3-2 score, and were sent to the "A" playoffs.

Goderich would face the Lucan-Ilderton Jets, who finished second in the South Division during the season, however, they were upset by the Monkton Wildcats in the "AA" qualifying round.  The Pirates kept the game close in the series opener, however, they lost in overtime as Lucan won the game 4-3.  The Jets took the second game of the series, defeating Goderich 5-2, followed by another overtime victory in the third game, as they beat the Pirates 5-4.  Goderich, fighting off elimination, won a very high scoring fourth game, as the Pirates defeated the Jets 11-8.  Lucan would rebound in the fifth game, easily defeating Goderich 9-4, and ending the Pirates season.

2009-10 Pirates Season
The Pirates would have a disappointing 2009-10 season, as the club finished with a 6-14-0 record, finishing in last place in the WOAA South Division standings, and failing to qualify for the "AA" playoffs.  Offense was a problem for Goderich, as they scored a league low 67 goals.

Goderich is currently facing the Walkerton Capitals and Drayton Icemen in a "B" round robin series.

Season-by-Season record
Note: GP = Games played, W = Wins, L = Losses, T= Tie, OTL = Overtime Losses, Pts = Points, GF = Goals for, GA = Goals against

More information will be added as more becomes available

Related links
Goderich, Ontario
Western Ontario Athletic Association
WOAA Senior Hockey League

External links
WOAA Website
WOAA Senior Hockey Website
Goderich Pirates Website

Senior ice hockey teams
Ice hockey teams in Ontario
Goderich, Ontario